Limestone Creek  is a stream in Bourbon and Allen counties, in the U.S. state of Kansas.

The creek was named from the limestone outcroppings along this stream.

Limestone Creek enters the Little Osage River southeast of Xenia, in Bourbon County.

See also
List of rivers of Kansas

References

Rivers of Allen County, Kansas
Rivers of Bourbon County, Kansas
Rivers of Kansas